Mandatory sentencing requires that offenders serve a predefined term for certain crimes, commonly serious and violent offenses. Judges are bound by law; these sentences are produced through the legislature, not the judicial system. They are instituted to expedite the sentencing process and limit the possibility of irregularity of outcomes due to judicial discretion. Mandatory sentences are typically given to people who are convicted of certain serious and/or violent crimes, and require a prison sentence. Mandatory sentencing laws vary across nations; they are more prevalent in common law jurisdictions because civil law jurisdictions usually prescribe minimum and maximum sentences for every type of crime in explicit laws.

Mandatory sentencing laws often target "moral vices" (such as alcohol, sex, drugs) and crimes that threaten a person's livelihood. The idea is that there are some crimes that are so heinous, there is no way to accept the offender back into the general population without first punishing them sufficiently. Some crimes are viewed as serious enough to require an indefinite removal from society by a life sentence, or sometimes capital punishment. It is viewed as a public service to separate these people from the general population, as it is assumed that the nature of the crime or the frequency of violation supersedes the subjective opinion of a judge. Remedying the irregularities in sentencing that arise from judicial discretion is supposed to make sentencing more fair and balanced. In Australia and the United Kingdom, sentencing has been heavily influenced by judicial idiosyncrasies. Individual judges have a significant effect on the outcome of the case, sometimes leading the public to believe that a sentence reflects more about the judge than the offender. Subsequently, creating stricter sentencing guidelines would promote consistency and fairness in the judicial system. Mandatory sentences are also supposed to serve as a general deterrence for potential criminals and repeat offenders, who are expected to avoid crime because they can be certain of their sentence if they are caught. This is the reasoning behind the "tough on crime" policy.

United States federal juries are generally not allowed to be informed of the mandatory minimum penalties that may apply if the accused is convicted because the jury's role is limited to a determination of guilt or innocence. However, defense attorneys sometimes have found ways to impart this information to juries; for instance, it is occasionally possible, on cross-examination of an informant who faced similar charges, to ask how much time he was facing. It is sometimes deemed permissible because it is a means of impeaching the witness. However, in at least one state court case in Idaho, it was deemed impermissible.

Notably, capital punishment has been mandatory for murder in a certain number of jurisdictions, including the United Kingdom until 1957 and Canada until 1961.

History

United States
Throughout US history, prison sentences were primarily founded upon what is known as discretionary sentencing. Leading up to this period of time, sentencing practices were largely criticized due to the discretionary applications used in sentencing. The assessment for sentencing was determined by three separate decisions (1) policy decisions, (2) factual decisions, and (3) decisions applying policy decisions to particular facts. In review of these policies regarding the applications of sentencing, the policy decisions are those that dictate what considerations should affect punishment. The second, which is factual determinations are the means by which a judge determines whether to apply a particular policy to an offender. The third decision judges make in discretionary schemes is how to apply the sentencing policies to the particular facts. This authority was applied by the judge under the discretionary sentencing system as historically practiced. It was not until the mid-twentieth century that mandatory sentencing was implemented. In short, the difference between mandatory and discretionary sentencing system lies in policy and application decisions.

Now that historical practices of sentencing have been introduced, it is just as important to outline examples in reference to (1) policy decisions, (2) factual decisions, and (3) decisions applying policy vs. decisions to particular facts.  
    
 Policy Decisions – Policy guidelines that determine what should be acknowledged in an individuals sentencing criteria. For example: One judge might consider a reduction in time to be served vs. a judge who intends to exercise the fullest extent of the law in reference to the crime committed.
 Factual Decisions – A review of details that would enable particular policies to be applied at the discretion of the assigned judge. Hypothetically consider, two or more individuals who attempt to commit a crime using a deadly weapon. Assume these individuals reach their destination point, where they plan to commit such a crime. Then the one individual who is primarily carrying the weapon takes it out to threaten another individual and waves it about, but is suddenly spooked enough that the weapon is dropped. While the other individual who accompanied the perpetrator decides to pick up the weapon, wave it about and even inflicts force of use with the weapon in order to attempt or commit the crime.

Their actions would result in punishment as a part of the sentencing process, regardless of the type of weapon in question. The 1st, individual in fact waved the weapon, but the 2nd, waved and inflicted force of use of the weapon. Therefore, the two individuals in question regarding the same crime would receive two separate sentences.

 Decisions Applying Policy vs. Decisions to Particular Facts – This form of application is the core of discretionary sentencing. It allows for sentencing to be tailored to an individual. For example, consider a minor juvenile who has committed a crime that would allow for a lengthy sentencing period, but because the individual is a minor the assigned judge can exercise discretion and decrease the sentence to be served vs. applying the full length of the sentencing as outlined in policy and the facts associated with the crime.

Overtime, the United States had under gone developmental growth in implementation of laws, sentencing guidelines and monumental transition points in time. Beginning in the early 1900s, the United States began to assess its role on the use of drugs, their purpose and the responsibilities within the law. During this time in 1914, opiate drug use outside of medical purpose was prohibited. It was not until 1930 that marijuana would reach the same platform as opiates, prohibiting use. This further led to stiffer regulations, even though the use of marijuana was not believed to evoke violent tenancies as previously suggested in earlier years, but this level of awareness had not reached public acknowledgment. Which further led to the implementation of sentencing guidelines in reference to drug use as well as sales consisting of opiates primarily (heroin and morphine), but also to include marijuana. The sentencing guidelines outlined applied to the use and sales of drugs. However, during this time discretionary sentencing was actively practiced. Therefore, the individuals who were guilty of using such drugs vs. the sale of such use typically resulted in different sentences.
Mandatory sentencing and increased punishment were enacted when the United States Congress passed the Boggs Act of 1951. The acts made a first time cannabis possession offense a minimum of two to ten years with a fine up to $20,000; however, in 1970, the United States Congress repealed mandatory penalties for cannabis offenses. With the passage of the Anti-Drug Abuse Act of 1986 Congress enacted different mandatory minimum sentences for drugs, including marijuana.

 1st Offense: 2–5 years.
 2nd Offense: 5–10 years.

The Anti-Drug Abuse Act of 1986 is the one act known for shaping America. The implementations of this act has had many profound affects in the legal system, as we know it today. This act led to a Drug Free initiative regarding an individual's employment, a Drug Free work place and certification requirements for employers, and a Drug Free environment for those who receive government benefits regarding low-income recipients and their housing. This act further addresses interventions regarding illegal sales of imports, the ability to overtake ones assets, if an individual is found guilty of distribution. The act also implemented the first laws surrounding money laundering, which also led to the exposure of professional dealers. Those found guilty of distribution were sentenced as outlined.

 5g of Crack vs. 500 g of Powder Cocaine resulted in a minimum sentencing of 5 years.
 50 g of Crack vs. 5,000 g of Powder Cocaine resulted in a minimum sentencing of 10 years.
 50 g of Powder Cocaine imported resulted in No Mandatory Sentence

Separate from each state's own courts, federal courts in the United States are guided by the Federal Sentencing Guidelines.  (See War on Drugs for more information about US drug laws.) When a guideline sentencing range is less than the statutory mandatory minimum, the latter prevails. Under the Controlled Substances Act, prosecutors have great power to influence a defendant's sentence and thereby create incentives to accept a plea agreement. In particular, defendants with prior drug felonies are often subject to harsh mandatory minimums, but the prosecutor can exercise his discretion to not file a prior felony information. Then the mandatory minimum will not be applied.

Safety Valve was created in 1994 to reduce mandatory sentencing for drug offenders under the following provisions:

 the defendant does not have more than 1 criminal history point, as determined under the sentencing guidelines;
 the defendant did not use violence or credible threats of violence or possess a firearm or other dangerous weapon (or induce another participant to do so) in connection with the offense;
 the offense did not result in death or serious bodily injury to any person;
 the defendant was not an organizer, leader, manager, or supervisor of others in the offense, as determined under the sentencing guidelines and was not engaged in a continuing criminal enterprise, as defined in section 408 of the Controlled Substances Act; and
 not later than the time of the sentencing hearing, the defendant has truthfully provided to the Government all information and evidence the defendant has concerning the offense or offenses that were part of the same course of conduct or of a common scheme or plan, but the fact that the defendant has no relevant or useful other information to provide or that the Government is already aware of the information shall not preclude a determination by the court that the defendant has complied with this requirement.

In October 2011 a report was issued to assess the impact of United States v. Booker mandatory minimum penalties on federal sentencing by the United States Sentencing Commission.

In 2013, United States Attorney General Eric H. Holder, Jr. announced that the Justice Department would follow a new policy restricting mandatory minimum sentences in certain drug cases.  Prosecutions dropped, drug enforcement agent morale dropped, and fentanyl and heroin overdoses soared, reported The Washington Post in 2019.  In Alleyne v. United States (2013) the Supreme Court held that increasing a sentence past the mandatory minimum requirement must be submitted by a jury and found factual beyond a reasonable doubt. It increases the burden on the prosecutor to prove that the sentence is necessary for the individual crime by requiring that a mandatory minimum sentence be denied for defendant unless they fulfill certain criteria. Attorney General Holder held that the charges placed on an individual should reflect the uniqueness of the case and consideration in assessing and fairly representing his/her given conduct. This is supposed to prevent recidivism.

Criminal justice advocates in the United States argue that mandatory minimum sentences are a major cause of the removal of the "bottom income half to quartile" of its population from the general public. As part of police targeting and surveillance and often harsh sentencing, mandatory sentencing often is proposed as "fairness" by those unfamiliar with the penal systems in the US. Mandatory sentencing still has not been linked to other areas such as racial profiling, a 700% increase in US prison incarceration rates, zero tolerance and prison growth at the expense of employment, housing, education, family support and quality of life.

The U.S. state of Florida has a 10-20-Life mandatory sentence law regarding sentences for the use of a firearm during the commission of another crime, and many PSA posters were created after the law was passed, which coined the slogan "Use a gun, and you’re done." It gave a minimum mandatory sentence of 10 years if the offender pulls a gun, but does not fire a shot, 20 years if at least one shot is fired, and 25 years to life if the offender shoots someone.

Australia

In 1996, 12-month mandatory sentencing laws around third offence home burglary were introduced by Western Australia through amendments to the 1913 Criminal Code. In 1997 mandatory sentencing was introduced to the Northern Territory in Australia. The three strikes and out policy raised incarceration rates of indigenous women by 223% in the first year. The incarceration rate for men rose by 57% and 67% for indigenous men. The mandatory sentencing laws sparked debate of the laws being discriminative (indirectly) as indigenous people are overrepresented in the crime statistics in the Northern Territory.

New South Wales has two mandatory sentences currently. The Crimes Amendment (Murder of Police Officers) Bill 2011 introduced mandatory life sentence without parole for a person convicted of murdering a police officer. Also, the Crimes and Other Legislation (Assault and Intoxication) Amendment 2014 introduced mandatory minimum sentencing of 8 years for alcohol fuelled acts of violence, as a response to the cases of king hit assaults in Sydney. These laws were championed by NSW Premier Barry O'Farrell largely due to the wide media coverage of similar cases, in particular the case of Kieren Loveridge who killed Thomas Kelly.

Life imprisonment is mandatory for murder in Queensland, South Australia, and the Northern Territory. Life imprisonment is only mandatory in the other states for aircraft hijacking or with a minimum non-parole period of 20 years (25 years in South Australia and the Northern Territory) if a criminal is convicted of the murder of a police officer or public official.

Australia also has legislation allowing mandatory prison sentences of between five and 25 years for people smuggling, in addition to a fine of up to $500,000, and forfeiture and destruction of the vessel or aircraft used in the offence.

In 2017, the government of Victoria introduced a "two-strike" policy, with a minimum six-year jail sentence for repeat violent offenders.

Victoria also has a mandatory 10-year minimum sentence for people convicted of killing someone in a so-called "one punch" attack.

Mandatory death sentence

 In Canada until 1961, murder was punishable only by death, provided that the offender was a sane adult, and until September 1, 1999, the National Defence Act specified a mandatory death sentence for certain acts (cowardice, desertion, unlawful surrender) if done traitorously.
 In 1930, the city of Canton (now Guangzhou), in China, enacted a mandatory death penalty for three-time offenders.
 In Czechoslovakia, under Beneš decree No. 16/1945 Coll., informing to German authorities during World War II's occupation was subject to a mandatory death sentence if it led to death of the person concerned by the act.
 In pre-1833 France, before juries were allowed to find mitigating circumstances to felonies, death penalty was the only available sentence for capital offenses. Given this, the question of mitigating circumstances became crucial when juries considered verdict against a person prosecuted for assassinat (roughtly first-degree murder) until the abolition of the guillotine in 1981. 
 In Hong Kong, murder carried a mandatory death sentence until 1993, when capital punishment was legally abolished. However, the last execution was in 1966, and all death sentences afterward were automatically commuted to life imprisonment. Since then, murder carries a mandatory life sentence.
 In India, murder committed by a convict serving a life sentence carries a mandatory death sentence. The mandatory death penalty provided in Section 31A of India Law is in the nature of minimum sentence in respect of repeat offenders of specified activities and for offences involving large quantities of specified categories of narcotic drugs. As of August 2005, aircraft hijacking also mandates use of the death penalty.
 In Japan, the only crime punishable by a mandatory death sentence is instigation of foreign aggression.
 In Malaysia and Singapore, there is a mandatory death penalty for certain offences, most notably murder and possession of a certain amount of controlled drugs (see Capital punishment in Singapore, Capital punishment in Malaysia and Capital punishment for drug trafficking), although recently these rules have been relaxed. Under the Arms Offences Act of Singapore, the death penalty is also mandatory for discharge of illegal firearms, and should an offender be found in possession of a firearm when arrested for any offence, the offender faces a mandatory life sentence with caning. Mandatory caning is also applied to cases like robbery under Singapore law.
 In Sweden, under the previous penal code (abolished in 1966), capital punishment was mandatory for prisoners serving a life sentence found guilty for murder or, unless under mitigating circumstances, manslaughter. The death penalty for murder was abolished in 1921.  
 In Taiwan, there used to be a large number of offenses that carried a mandatory death penalty; by 2006, all these laws have been relaxed to permit judicial discretion.
 In the United Kingdom, crimes punishable by a mandatory death sentence included murder (until 1957, and from 1957 to 1965 if certain aggravating criteria were met, such as murder by firearm or murders on separate occasions), treason (until 1998), sedition and espionage.
 In the United States, mandatory death sentences were determined to be unconstitutional in 1976, following the U.S. Supreme Court's decision in  Woodson v. North Carolina. They were mainly used for murder and assault by convicts serving life sentences.
In Israel, the Nazis and Nazi Collaborators (Punishment) Law mandates a death penalty for those found guilty of war crimes, crimes against humanity, or crimes against the Jewish people.

Other
Denmark has mandatory minimum sentences for murder (five years to life) and regicide (life in prison § 115), deadly arson is punished with imprisonment from 4 years to life, and for an illegal loaded gun one year in state prison.

The state of Florida in the United States has a very strict minimum sentencing policy known as 10-20-Life, which includes the following minimums: 10 years' imprisonment for using a gun during a crime, 20 years' imprisonment for firing a gun during a crime, and 25 years' imprisonment in addition to any other sentence for shooting somebody, regardless of whether they survive or not.

In Canada and Ireland, life imprisonment is mandatory for murder if committed, at the time of the offence, as an adult. Parole ineligibility periods vary, but under Irish and Canadian law, are not less than 7 and 10 years, respectively.

In New Zealand, life imprisonment is mandatory for murder. Murders with certain aggravating factors have a mandatory 17-year non-parole period, instead of the default 10 years for life imprisonment. Since 2002, judges have the ability to overrule mandatory sentences where they would be deemed "manifestly unjust", such as in cases involving mercy killings and failed suicide pacts.

In Germany, murder for pleasure, sexual gratification, greed or other base motives, by stealth or cruelly or by means that pose a danger to the public or to facilitate or cover up another offense is mandatorily punished by life imprisonment.

In Ireland, Acts of the Oireachtas specify a mandatory sentence of life imprisonment for murder and treason, and mandatory minimum sentences for various lesser offences. A mandatory minimum sentence may be truly mandatory or may be presumptive, giving a judge discretion to impose a lesser sentence in exceptional circumstances. Mandatory sentences have been challenged on grounds that they violate the separation of powers required by  the constitution, by allowing the Oireachtas (legislature) to interfere in the judicial process. In 2012 the Supreme Court ruled that the mandatory sentence of life imprisonment for murder was constitutional. However, in 2019, it ruled that a mandatory minimum sentence had to apply for all offenders, not for certain classes of offenders. It struck out a sentence of 5 years for possession of a firearm, because it was truly mandatory only for a second offence, whereas it would have been presumptively mandatory for a first offence. A mandatory sentence for a second offence of drug trafficking was struck out in 2021 for similar reasons; the conviction was upheld but the sentence referred back to the Circuit Court for reconsideration.

In the United Kingdom, upon conviction for murder, the court must sentence the defendant to life imprisonment. The law requires that courts must set a minimum term before they become eligible for parole. For this purpose a number of "starting points" are in place that give guidance to a judge to impose a sentence in each different case of murder. There are currently five "starting points" for murder in England and Wales, namely: 12 years' imprisonment for cases of murder committed by a person under 18; 15 years' imprisonment for all "other" cases of murder committed by a person over 18; 25 years' imprisonment for cases of murder where a person over 18 uses a knife or other weapon at the scene; 30 years' imprisonment for cases of murder with "particularly" high aggravating factors, such as those that involve the use of a firearm or explosive, or a murder in the course of committing another offence such as robbery or burglary; and a whole life order, in cases that involve such "exceptionally" high aggravating factors, such as the murder of two or more persons, or the murder of a child following abduction or with sexual/sadistic motivation, meaning the person will never become eligible for parole.

The United Kingdom currently also has three more mandatory minimum sentences for certain offences, namely: a minimum of 7 years' imprisonment for a person over 18 convicted of trafficking, supplying or producing Class A drugs for the third or subsequent time; a minimum of 5 years' imprisonment (for a person over 18) or 3 years' imprisonment (for a person aged 16–17) for possession, purchase, acquisition, manufacture, transfer or sale of a prohibited firearm or weapon for the first or subsequent time; and a minimum of 3 years' imprisonment for a person over 18 convicted of a domestic burglary for the third or subsequent time.

Three strikes law

In 1994, California introduced a "Three Strikes Law". This state is known for fully enforcing laws and is considered most severe in comparison to other states. The Three strikes law was intended to reduce crime by implementing extended sentencing to deter repeated offenders. This consideration further restricts one's ability to commit new crimes.  Similar laws were subsequently adopted in most American jurisdictions.

However, California's "Three Strikes Law" is clearly outlined for all, especially those who are subjected to such sentencing.

strike (1)
 Directly affects individuals who exhibit a history regarded as violent or serious pertaining to their initial felony conviction. Should this history exist, it could greatly impact sentencing guidelines surrounding an individuals present felony conviction.

strike (2)
 An individual who has committed a crime resulting in their 2nd felony conviction, would be affected by the second strike as well. This would impact the length of the individuals sentencing by doubling the sentence one would initially be subject to, if it were their first felony conviction.

strike (3) 
 Is intended individuals who appear to be repeated offenders. Therefore, this strike is for individuals who have two or more felony convictions, their sentencing would result in a minimum of 25 years to life.

A similar "three strikes" policy was introduced to the United Kingdom by the Conservative government in 1997. This legislation enacted a mandatory life sentence on a conviction for a second "serious" violent or sexual offence (i.e. "two strikes" law), a minimum sentence of seven years for those convicted for a third time of a drug trafficking offence involving a class A drug, and a mandatory minimum sentence of three years for those convicted for the third time of burglary. An amendment by the Labour opposition established that mandatory sentences should not be imposed if the judge considered it unjust.

According to figures released by the British government in 2005, just three drug dealers and eight burglars received mandatory sentences in the next seven years, because judges thought a longer sentence was unjust in all other drug and burglary cases where the defendant was found guilty. However, in 2003 a new "two strikes" law was enacted (effective from April 4, 2005), requiring courts to presume that a criminal who commits his second violent or dangerous offence deserves a life sentence unless the judge is satisfied that the defendant is not a danger to the public. This resulted in far more life sentences than the 1997 legislation. In response to prison overcrowding, the law was changed in 2008 to reduce the number of such sentences being passed, by restoring judicial discretion and abolishing the presumption that a repeat offender is dangerous.

Australia's Northern Territory in March 1997 introduced mandatory sentences of one month to one year for the third offence regarding property and theft. They were later adopted by Western Australia.

Race

Concerning US federal prisons, Barbara S. Meierhoefer, in her report for the Federal Judicial Center stated: "The proportion of black offenders grew from under 10% in 1984 to 28% of the mandatory minimum drug offenders by 1990; whites now constitute less than a majority of this group. This is a much more dramatic shift than found in the federal offender population in general."

According to the Statistical Overview of Mandatory Minimum Penalties presented in October 2011, "[o]f all offenders convicted of an offense carrying a mandatory minimum punishment and who remained subject to that penalty at sentencing, 38.5 percent were Black (n=4,076), 31.8 percent were Hispanic (n=3,364), and 27.5 percent (n=2,913) were White."

Although exceptions such as the safety valve are authorized, demographics associated with race relevant to mandatory sentencing continue to show. "Hispanic offenders received relief from applicable mandatory minimum penalties at the highest rates, with rates of 65.9 percent in fiscal year 2000, 57.7 percent in fiscal year 2005, and 55.7 percent in fiscal year 2010. Other Race offenders had the next highest rates (52.8% in fiscal year 2000, 53.1% in fiscal year 2005 and 58.9% in fiscal year 2010). Black offenders consistently had the lowest rates (45.7% in fiscal year 2000, 32.8 percent in fiscal year 2005, and 34.9% in fiscal year 2010). White offenders received relief at 60.3 percent in fiscal year 2000, 42.5 percent in fiscal year 2005, and 46.5 percent in fiscal year 2010."

Reception 

Supporters of mandatory sentencing argue that it decreases more serious crimes, stops unjustified sentencing, removes bias from all involved parties, and provides longer protection of society from criminals. Opponents of mandatory sentencing argue that it decreases a judge's role in sentencing, is not always applied effectively, can be misused to target minority groups, that the threat of mandatory sentencing can be used by law enforcement to coerce people, prevents punishments from being lessened, significantly raises people's taxes, and is not always used to handle violent crime.

Opponents of mandatory sentencing point to studies that show criminals are deterred more effectively by increasing the chances of their conviction, rather than increasing the sentence if they are convicted. In a hearing of the House Judiciary Committee, Judge Paul G. Cassell, from the United States District Court for the District of Utah, described mandatory sentencing as resulting in harsh sentencing and cruel and unusual punishment, stating that the sentencing requirements punish defendants "more harshly for crimes that threaten potential violence than for crimes that conclude in actual violence to victims". A hearing in 2009 heard testimony from the American Bar Association which stated that "Sentencing by mandatory minimums is the antithesis of rational sentencing policy". In 2004 the association called for the repeal of mandatory minimum sentences, stating that "there is no need for mandatory minimum sentences in a guided sentencing system." A 1997 study by the RAND Corporation found that mandatory minimums for cocaine offenses were not cost-effective in regards to either cocaine consumption or drug crime.

Some judges have expressed the opinion that mandatory minimum sentencing, especially in relation to alcohol-fueled violence, is not effective. In R v O’Connor, the High Court of Australia gave the opinion that when an offender is intoxicated, there will likely be a change in their personality and behaviour, which will then affect their self-control; that, while an offender may commit an act which is voluntary and intentional, it is not something that they would have done in a sober state. Intoxication is not a justification for criminal behaviour, nor (in most jurisdictions in the U.S. and Commonwealth) a legal defence; but since an intoxicated person's decisions are less likely to be shaped by rational assessment of consequences than those of a sober person, deterrence is likely to be less effective for intoxicated people.

Research indicates that mandatory minimum sentencing effectively shifts discretion from judges to the prosecutors. Prosecutors decide what charges to bring against a defendant, and they can "stack the deck", which involves over-charging a defendant to get them to plead guilty. Since prosecutors are part of the executive branch, and the judicial branch has almost no role in the sentencing, the checks and balances of the democratic system are removed, thus diluting the notion of separation of powers. Opponents of mandatory sentencing argue that it is the proper role of a judge, not a prosecutor, to apply discretion given the particular facts of a case (e.g., whether a drug defendant was a kingpin or low-level participant, or whether sex offender registration is an appropriate measure for a given crime and offender). When prosecutors apply discretion, they tend to invoke sentencing disparities when choosing among a variety of statutes with different sentencing consequences. In addition to fairness arguments, some opponents believe that treatment is more cost-effective than long sentences. They also cite a survey indicating that the public now prefers judicial discretion to mandatory minimums.

In 2015, a number of United States reformers, including the ACLU, the Center for American Progress, Families Against Mandatory Minimums, Koch family foundations, the Coalition for Public Safety, and the MacArthur Foundation, announced a bipartisan resolution to reform the criminal justice system and reduce mandatory sentencing laws. Their efforts were lauded by President Obama who noted these reforms will improve rehabilitation and workforce opportunities for those who have served their sentences. In their arguments they noted that mandatory sentencing is often too harsh of a punishment and cripples someone's livelihood for minor crimes.

In 2019, then presidential candidate Joe Biden unveiled his criminal justice reform plan which would eliminate mandatory minimum sentences.

People sentenced to mandatory sentences
 Weldon Angelos – 55 years for possessing a handgun while he sold $350 worth of marijuana to a police informant on three separate occasions
 Leandro Andrade  – 50 years without parole for theft of nine video tapes
 Morton Berger – 200 years without probation, parole or pardon for twenty counts of sexual exploitation of a minor; each count represented a separate child pornography image he had possessed
 Genarlow Wilson – 10 years for aggravated child molestation; released in 2007 after serving four years because the courts decided his sentence was disproportionate to the actual facts of the crime
 Chantal McCorkle – 24 years for fraud and conspiracy to commit fraud; sentence subsequently reduced to 18 years on appeal
 Richard Paey – 25 years for 15 counts of drug trafficking and other charges including fraud; granted a pardon in 2007 after serving three and a half years due to the circumstances of his drug use
 Timothy L. Tyler – Life in prison for possessing 13 sheets of LSD.
 John the Painter – Sentenced to death for arson in royal dockyards.
 Van Tuong Nguyen – Sentenced to death for trafficking 396.2g of heroin through Singapore
, mandatory death sentence for crimes against humanity. On appeal to the Israeli Supreme Court, he was acquitted of the charge carrying the mandatory death penalty and his sentence was reduced to two years.
Adolf Eichmann and Ivan Demjanjuk were both subject to mandatory death sentence after being convicted of crimes against humanity, war crimes, and crimes against the Jewish people. Demjanjuk's sentence was overturned on appeal on the basis of reasonable doubt after new evidence emerged.
 Yong Vui Kong, a drug trafficker from Malaysia, was sentenced to the mandatory penalty of death in 2008 for trafficking more than 47 grams of heroin into Singapore. After the changes to the death penalty laws in Singapore, which removed the mandatory death sentence for certified drug couriers convicted of drug trafficking, Yong was certified to be a drug courier and thus he, together with some of the other convicted drug traffickers on death row, became eligible to reduce his sentence. Following an appeal, Yong's death sentence was reduced to life imprisonment and 15 strokes of the cane.
 Kho Jabing and Galing Anak Kujat were two Malaysians and foreign workers working in Singapore on work permits. They were both condemned to hang in 2010 by the High Court of Singapore for the 2008 robbery and murder of 40-year-old Cao Ruyin (murder warrants a mandatory death sentence in Singapore). Following an appeal in 2011, Galing's conviction was reduced to robbery with hurt and his sentence was lowered to 18 and a half years in prison with 19 strokes of the cane. After the Singapore government removed the mandatory death penalty in January 2013 for crimes of murder with no intention to kill, Kho Jabing's death sentence was commuted to life imprisonment and 24 strokes of the cane following a re-trial in the High Court in August 2013. However, the prosecution appealed against the life sentence, and thus in 2015, the five-judge Court of Appeal, by a decision of 3 to 2, sentenced Kho to death. Eventually, Kho Jabing was executed on the afternoon of May 20, 2016, by long drop hanging in Changi Prison.
 Singaporeans Adrian Lim, Tan Mui Choo, and Hoe Kah Hong who were hanged in 1988 for killing two children in the 1981 Toa Payoh ritual murders case in Singapore.
 Mohammed Ali bin Johari, who was hanged in 2008 for the child rape and murder of his stepdaughter in Singapore.
 Took Leng How, a Malaysian and vegetable packer who was hanged in 2006 for murdering 8-year-old Huang Na.
 Flor Contemplacion, a Filipino domestic worker executed in March 1995 for murdering another Filipino domestic worker and a four-year-old boy.
 John Martin Scripps, a British spree killer hanged in April 1996 for murdering three tourists. He was the first Briton to receive a mandatory death sentence in Singapore and also the first to be executed in Singapore since the country gained independence in 1965.
 Sek Kim Wah, a Singaporean NS army conscript who was hanged on December 9, 1988, for the 1983 Andrew Road triple murders and used a rifle to commit robbery at the same time. He was also responsible for a double murder near Seletar Road.
 Iskandar bin Rahmat, a former police officer from the Singapore Police Force, was convicted of two counts of murder with intention to kill and was thus subjected to the mandatory death penalty. He was responsible for killing a father and son during a robbery in Singapore, for which the case made national headlines as the Kovan double murders.
 Ong Hwee Kuan, Ong Chin Hock and Yeo Ching Boon, three youths and friends all of the same age, were given the mandatory death sentence for the robbery, kidnapping and murder of 18-year-old policeman Lee Kim Lai on April 25, 1978. They were all executed on the same day in February 1984.
 Anthony Ler Wee Teang, a 34-year-old Singaporean who, in May 2001, manipulated a 15-year-old male teenager to murder his wife Annie Leong Wai Mun. He received the mandatory death penalty after being found guilty of abetting the murder, and was hanged in December 2002. The youth, who was not publicly identified due to his age, was found guilty of murder, but was spared the mandatory death penalty and was indefinitely detained for 17 years at the President's Pleasure. The boy, then aged 32, was released in 2018 after the President of Singapore granted him clemency and commuted his sentence.
Ahmad Najib bin Aris, a Malaysian who was sentenced to death in 2005 for abducting, murdering and raping 32-year-old Canny Ong in 2003, for which the case made shocking headlines in Malaysia. Additionally, Ahmad Najib received another sentence of 20 years' jail with 10 strokes of the cane for rape. The higher courts of Malaysia upheld and eventually finalized Ahmad Najib's death sentence, resulting in his execution on September 23, 2016, 13 years after Ong's murder.
 Mathavakannan Kalimuthu, an Indian Singaporean who was sentenced to death on November 27, 1996, for murdering a gangster on May 26, 1996. Mathavakannan was subsequently granted clemency from then President of Singapore Ong Teng Cheong, who commuted his mandatory death sentence to life imprisonment. His two accomplices Asogan Ramesh Ramachandren and Selvar Kumar Silvaras were hanged in May 1998 after failing to receive clemency.
 Wang Zhijian, a Chinese national who murdered his girlfriend and both her daughter and flatmate in their rented flat in Yishun, Singapore in 2008. He was sentenced to death in 2012 for murder, and lost his appeal in 2014; Wang was presumably executed after 2014.
 Nagaenthran K. Dharmalingam, a Malaysian who was convicted of drug trafficking and executed despite (unproven) allegations that he was mentally disabled
 Hannah Ocuish – a 12-year-old American girl sentenced to death for first-degree murder despite age and intellectual disability
 Darrell Brooks was sentenced to mandatory life in prison for six counts of First-Degree Intentional Homicide. He was also found guilty on 70 other charges and was sentenced to 1067 years of imprisonment and supervised release.
 Teo Ghim Heng - a 44-year-old Singaporean and former property agent who murdered his pregnant wife and daughter in 2017. He received two mandatory death sentences for two charges of premeditated murder (or intentional murder), the most serious degree of murder which was solely punishable by death under Singapore law.

See also
 Fact bargaining
 Fair Sentencing Act
 U.S. v. Booker
 Zero tolerance, a similar political concept

Footnotes

  Chart of current U.S. federal mandatory minimum drug sentences. U.S. Drug Enforcement Administration.
  Interfaith Drug Policy Initiative page on Hamedah Hasan
  Mandatory sentencing for adult property offenders: The Northern Territory Experience (2003)

References
 Boatwright v. State – Supreme Court of Florida
 Paey v. State – Supreme Court of Florida
 State of Pennsylvania v. Shiffler
 Tronsoco v. State of Florida 
 Tango v. State Parole Board of New Jersey(broken link)
 State of Florida v. Christian

External links
 Mandatory Death Penalty: Death Penalty Worldwide  Academic research database on the laws, practice, and statistics of capital punishment for every death penalty country in the world.
 U.S. Attorneys – Discussion of Selected Section 844 Offenses
 Trends in State Parole, 1990–2000. NCJ 184735. U.S. Bureau of Justice Statistics. October 3, 2001. (BJS). By Allen J. Beck, PhD, Timothy A. Hughes, Doris J. James Wilson. "The report compares discretionary and mandatory releases to parole with the type of discharge from parole supervision."
 Mandatory Minimum Sentencing | Drug War Facts. Common Sense for Drug Policy. MM info with sources.
 Federal Mandatory Minimum Sentencing Statutes Congressional Research Service
 Federal Mandatory Minimum Sentencing: The 18 U.S.C. 924(c) Tack-On in Cases Involving Drugs or Violence Congressional Research Service

Sentencing (law)
History of drug control